Black Mamba Serums v2.0 is a solo studio album by American hip hop musician Bigg Jus, a former member of Company Flow. It was released on Big Dada in 2004.

Critical reception

Mike Krolak of Prefix gave the album a 7 out of 10, saying, "Still shunning the money-cash-hoes routine for abstract, brain-twisting beats and rhymes, Jus clearly hash't let his skills atrophy." Jack Smith of BBC Music wrote, "This is an engaging effort that can only build on the legacy of Company Flow."

In 2015, Fact placed it at number 16 on the "100 Best Indie Hip-Hop Records of All Time" list.

Track listing

References

External links
 

2004 albums
Bigg Jus albums
Big Dada albums